Zaplavka is a rural locality (a selo) in Plotnikovskoye Rural Settlement, Danilovsky District, Volgograd Oblast, Russia. The population was 181 as of 2010. There are 8 streets.

Geography 
Zaplavka is located in steppe, on the north-west bank of the Bobrovoye Lake, 26 km northwest of Danilovka (the district's administrative centre) by road. Bobry is the nearest rural locality.

References 

Rural localities in Danilovsky District, Volgograd Oblast